The Kennedys may refer to:

 The Kennedy family, an American political family
 The Kennedys (museum), a German museum about the Kennedy family
 The Kennedys (band), an American folk rock band
 The Kennedys (miniseries), a Canadian miniseries about the Kennedy family broadcast in 2011
 The Kennedys (TV series), a British sitcom

See also
Kennedy (disambiguation)